is a 1992 Japanese film directed by Masayuki Suo. It was chosen as Best Film at the Japan Academy Prize ceremony. It is one of the few notable depictions of sumo in film.

Plot
Kyoritsu University student Shuhei Yamamoto gets a job with his uncle's connection but learns he's missing the credits to graduate from the supervisor of his graduation thesis, Professor Anayama. He makes a deal with Shuhei that if he participates in the tournament for Kyoritsu's sumo club, he would be willing to overlook his credits. Shuhei reluctantly accepts with the request of Natsuko Kawamura, a graduate student from the Anayama Lab and a sumo club manager.

The Sumo Club's only member is Aoki Tomio, a traditionalist sumo enthusiast who has repeated years. Shuhei and Aoki struggle to recruit Shuhei's younger brother Haruo and obese Hosaku Tanaka. The amateur team loses at the tournament, and are abused by alumnus at the afterparty. Shuhei promises they'll win next, recruiting a British student and experienced footballer George Smiley who joined to save on rent. During the summer vacation, the team visits Anayama's hometown for a training camp. At the end of the camp, the team plays a practice match against elementary schoolers in the neighbourhood.

The team wins the next third league match and replaced the second league. Haruo breaks his arm in the third match, and Shuhei is injured. Masako Mamiya, a female manager longing for Haruo, volunteers to join as a member. On the day of the match, Masako binds her chest with bandages and tape but loses. The Sumo Club is inspired by her attempt and win the league match.

Tanaka is scouted for sumo wrestling, Smiley returns to Britain, Masako and Haruo leave to study abroad in London, and Aoki graduates. Shuhei declines the job offer to continue the sumo club as the sole member. Natsuko visits him in the club, and the movie ends as they playfully practice shiko.

Cast

Reception
The film has been described by Japan Times columnist and sumo commentator John Gunning as "well-crafted and at times touching" and he notes that it is virtually the only big-screen sumo film with the exception of the Wakanohana Kanji I biopic Devil of the Dohyō.

Awards and nominations
16th Japan Academy Prize 
Won: Best Picture
Won: Best Director - Masayuki Suo
Won: Best Screenplay - Masayuki Suo
Won: Best Actor - Masahiro Motoki
Won: Best Supporting Actor - Naoto Takenaka
Nominated: Best Supporting Actress - Misa Shimizu
Nominated: Best Editing - Junichi Kikuchi

TV series
The film was remade as a television series, with Misa Shimizu and Naoto Takenaka reprising their roles, which premiered on Disney+ on October 26, 2022.

References

External links
 
 
 
 
 
 
 

1992 films
1992 comedy films
Films directed by Masayuki Suo
1990s sports comedy films
1990s Japanese-language films
Sumo films
Picture of the Year Japan Academy Prize winners
Best Film Kinema Junpo Award winners
Japanese sports comedy films
Daiei Film films
1990s Japanese films